Blue Oranges is a 2009 Bollywood film produced by S M Ferozeuddin Alameer under the Khussro Films banner and directed by Rajesh Ganguly. The film features Rajit Kapur, Rati Agnihotri, Harsh Chhaya, and Aham Sharma in key roles.

Plot
The film is a crime, suspense thriller where Rajit Kapur plays the role of the detective Nilesh. Nilesh has to investigate the murder of a rich alcoholic woman (Pooja Kanwal). He investigates a bunch of suspects such as the murdered woman’s ex-lover (Aham Sharma), the tenant's son, a rich-brat who gave the woman a lift and the police commissioner's own brother (Harsh Chhaya) who had befriended her, before arriving at the truth. The film is shot in a flashback-and-forth mode of storytelling.

Cast
 Rajit Kapur  ...  Nilesh  
 Harsh Chhaya  ...  Anurag Dixit  
 Rati Agnihotri  ...  Uma Dixit  
 Aham Sharma  ...  Kevin Travasso  
 Pooja Kanwal  ...  Shalini Chauhan  
 Richashree  ...  Rati Bose  
 Shishir Sharma  ...  Commissioner Dixit  
 Shivani Joshi  ...  Rudra  
 Anupam Shyam  ...  Ramprasad  
 Akhil Mishra  ...  Mr. Goel  
 Asheesh Kapur  ...  Hari Goel  
 Rasika Joshi  ...  Mrs. Goel  
 Javed Abedi  ...  Doctor  
 Rajeev Acharya  ...  Principal  
 Kamal Adib  ...  Sunil Mehra  
 Imtiaz Amir  ...  Judge  
 Honey Chhaya  ...  Old Man in jail  
 Naina Dixit  ...  News Reader  
 Yusuf Hussain  ...  Janak Raj Chauhan  
 Alex Joseph  ...  Jail Warden  
 Siddhant Karnick  ...  Aditya Mehra  
 Bharat Kaul  ...  Mr. Mehta  
 Moin Khan  ...  Man with Ranjit's wife  
 Neeraj Kumar  ...  Ranjit  
 Sujata Kumar  ...  Dr. Reddy  
 Anjali Londhe  ...  Ranit's wife  
 Jagruti Mehta  ...  Maid Servant  
 Nandu  ...  Police with fax  
 Chandrabhan Patel  ...  Drug Pedlar  
 Himanshu Powdwal  ...  Control room investigator  
 Jaspal Sandhu  ...  Jailor  
 Simran Sawhney  ...  Henchman  
Savi Sidhu  ...  Mahadev (as Savi Siddhu)
 Satyendra Verma  ...  Lawyer

Reception
The Times of India rated the movie 2.5/5 stars and although the movie was appreciated for being painstakingly crafted; it was criticized for being too dour and clinical and bereft of humour, pace and drama.

Subhash K Jha too rated the movie 2.5/5 stars and summed up his review as "If there are no highs in the narration, there are no plunging lows either"  and singled out Rajit Kapur’s acting as the one stand-out performance.

References

External links
 

2009 films
2000s Hindi-language films